Giro del Friuli is a road bicycle race held annually in Friuli Venezia Giulia, Italy. The first edition took place in 1974. From 2005 to 2008 the race was suspended, but it returned in 2009 as a 1.1 event on the UCI Europe Tour.

Winners

UCI Europe Tour races
Cycle races in Italy
Sport in Friuli-Venezia Giulia
Recurring sporting events established in 1974
1974 establishments in Italy